Cornelius Cooper (born January 10, 1947) is a former American football player and coach.  He was the 13th head football coach at Prairie View A&M University in Prairie View, Texas and he held that position for two seasons, from 1980 until 1981.  His record at Prairie View was 4–16.

Cooper played offensive tackle at Prairie View and was selected in the 11th round (280th overall pick) of the in 1968 NFL Draft by the Miami Dolphins.

Cooper later taught in the West Orange-Cove Consolidated Independent School District.

Head coaching record

References

1947 births
Living people
American football offensive linemen
Prairie View A&M Panthers football coaches
Prairie View A&M Panthers football players